The Ministry of Economy and Finance, also known by the acronym MEF, is a ministry of the Italian government. Its responsibilities include overseeing economic policy, public investments and spending. The Ministry's headquarters are located in Rome's historic Palazzo delle Finanze. The current minister in the Meloni Cabinet is Giancarlo Giorgetti.

History 
Already in 1947 the De Gasperi III Cabinet tried to merge the pre-existing Ministries of Treasure and Finance but it found a political opposition due to the great power concentrated in the hands of minister Pietro Campilli, and the project was abandoned for over fifty years.

MEF was created with the Bassanini reform which unified the economical ministers with the legislative decree n. 300 of 1999. In 2001 the Berlusconi II Cabinet applied the reform and the MEF was created with the merger of former ministries: the Ministry of Treasure, Budget and Economic Programming and the Ministry of Finances.

Four fiscal agencies were connected to the Ministry: Agenzia delle entrate ('Revenue Agency'), Agenzia del territorio ('Land Registry'), Agenzia del demanio ('State Property') and Agenzia delle dogane e dei monopoli ('Customs and Monopolies'). These entities are completely autonomous but they work closely with the MEF. In 2012, Agenzia del territorio was merged into the Agenzia delle entrate, while the Agenzia delle dogane absorbed the Amministrazione autonoma dei monopoli di stato ('Autonomous Administration of State Monopolies').

Functions 
According to the legislative decree n. 300/1999, MEF carries out functions and purposes of the State about economic policies, public finance and budget in relation to the programming of public funding, coordination of public expenditure and its control, fiscal policies and the tributary system, properties of the State, cadastre and customs, planning, coordination and control of interventions for the economic, territorial and sectorial development and policies of cohesion.

MEF organizes and manages the State budget, including the fulfilments of treasury and verifies the related trends and cash flows, ensuring the operating connection with the accomplishments in the field of the coverage of financial requirement. The Ministry verifies the quantification of the resulting charges of measures and changing of laws and it monitors the public expenditure, coordinating and verifying its trends and doing the controls required by law.

The economical and financial planning is made by MEF, which coordinates and verifies the interventions for the economical development in territorial and sectorial fields and for the cohesion policies, with the help of the Chambers of Commerce. According to art. 56 of the legislative decree 300/1999, MEF analyses the fiscal system and the choices on the tributary and treasury entries at the national, community and international level, as well as on the coordination activities.

Its activity is coordinated with the four fiscal agencies, regulated by a dedicated agreement, to which the Ministry gives the goals to fulfil and appoints the directors.

MEF undergoes supervisory tasks on entities, activities and functions related to the relationship with the authorities of supervision and control required by law, according to the art. 23, paragraph 2 of the legislative decree 300/1999.

The minister of economics is a member of the Supreme Council of Defence.

Organization 
The Ministry has a complex central structure derived from the merging of former ministries and from various modifications: main variations have been made with the legislative decree n. 173 of 3 July 2003, and the decree of the President of Republic n. 227 of 3 July 2003. The Ministry was reorganized with the Presidential Decree n. 43 of 30 January 2008 which established offices in direct collaboration of the minister and proper departments of the MEF.

Main departments 
 The Dipartimento del Tesoro (DT, 'Department of Treasury') performs consulting activities and technical support for economic policy choices of the Government, develops macroeconomic strategies and elaborates the planning documents. It analyses the economical, monetary and financial problems at national and international level and manages the public debt. DT administrates the shareholdings of the State and the financial interventions in the economy, it regulates and oversees the financial and credit system as well as the valorisation of public properties. 
 The Ragioneria Generale dello Stato (RGS, 'General State Account') coordinates the budget policies and verifies trends of the public finance. Its main institutional purpose is to guarantee the correct management and the strict planning of the public resources, to give certainty to State accounts through verification and analysis of the public expenditure trends. The RGS exercises functions of control on the financial management of public entities.
 The Dipartimento delle Finanze (DF 'Finances Department') addresses and directs the overall national fiscal system and gives implementation to the Minister directives regarding taxation. Its activity is finalized to plan and coordinate the strategies of tax policy, to control their application evaluating the effects.
 The Dipartimento dell'Amministrazione Generale, del Personale e dei Servizi (DAG, 'Department of General Administration, Personnel and Services') manages the human resources of MEF and the organization of the informative system, as well as the institutional communication of the Ministry. The DAG gives services to other administrations in the field of purchases, payroll management of public employers and rationalization of properties.

Territorial departments 
At peripheral level, MEF is organized in Ragionerie Territoriali dello Stato (RTS, 'Territorial State Accounts') which depend organically and functionally on the Dipartimento della Ragioneria Generale dello Stato ('Department of the General State Accounting').

Until 28 February 2011, there were also the Direzioni territoriali dell'economia e delle finanze (DTEF, 'Territorial Directions of Econoy and Finance') depending on the Dipartimento dell'Amministrazione Generale, del Personale e dei Servizi ('Department of General Administration, Personnel and Services') but the Ministerial Decree of 23 December 2010 established the interruption of its activities.

The functions of DTEFs have been adsorbed mostly by the RTS but not all its personnel, because a part of it has passed in the Agency for Monopolies.

Fiscal agencies 
Fiscal agencies are completely autonomous but they work closely to the Minister. The main entities are:

Agenzia delle entrate ('Revenue Agency'), which collects taxes for the State (In 2012, it adsorbed Agenzia del territorio, the agency which managed cadastral and cartographic services, real estate advertising services, technical estimates and the Observatory of Real Estate);
Agenzia del demanio, which manages the State properties;
Agenzia delle dogane e dei monopoli ('Customs and Monopolies Agency'), which manages the customs and, since 2012, it has the functions of the Amministrazione autonoma dei monopoli di Stato (AAMS, 'Autonomous Administration of State Monopolies').

Agencies have own headquarters in Rome and peripheral offices in all the national territory.

Tributary justice 
Within the Ministry there is the Consiglio di presidenza della giustizia tributaria ('Presidential Council of Tributary Justice'), a body of self-government of tax judges with similar purposes to the High Council of the Judiciary. Tax judges operate in the tax commissions and have the status of honorary magistrates, and they are appointed by the Minister of Economy and Finances on designation of the Presidency Council of Tax Justice.

Guardia di Finanza 

The Guardia di Finanza is a militarized police force with tasks regarding investigation, prevention and repression of administrative and penal violations in the field of taxation, customs, currency and fiscal as well as judiciary police. The Guardia di Finanza is essentially responsible for dealing with financial crimes and smuggling; it has also evolved into Italy's primary agency for suppressing the illegal drug trade. It directly depends on the MEF and hierarchically on the General Command of Guardia di Finanza headquartered in Rome.

Shareholdings 
MEF holds shares in strategic companies and public entities. Main shareholdings are the followings:

Listed companies 
Banca Monte dei Paschi di Siena S.p.A. (68,25%)
 ENAV S.p.A. (53,28%)
ENEL S.p.A. (23,59%)
 Eni S.p.A. (4,34%)
 Leonardo S.p.A. (30,20%) aka Finmeccanica
 Poste Italiane S.p.A. (29,26%)

Companies having listed financial instruments 
 Invitalia - Agenzia nazionale per l'attrazione degli investimenti e lo sviluppo d'impresa S.p.a (100%)
 CDP - Cassa Depositi e Prestiti S.p.a. (82,77%)
 Ferrovie dello Stato Italiane S.p.a. (100%)
 Rai Radiotelevisione Italiana S.p.a. (99,56%)
 Società per la Gestione di Attività - S.G.A. S.p.a. (100%)

Unlisted companies 
 Arexpo S.p.a. (39,28%)
Alitalia – Società Aerea Italiana S.p.A. (100%)
 Consap S.p.A. (100%)
 Consip S.p.A. (100%)
 Equitalia Giustizia S.p.a. (100%)
 EUR S.p.a. (90%)
 Gestore dei Servizi Energetici GSE S.p.A. (100%)
 INVIMIT SGR - Investimenti Immobiliari Italiani Società di Gestione del Risparmio S.p.a. (100%)
 Istituto Poligrafico e Zecca dello Stato S.p.A. (100%)
ITA - Italia Trasporto Aereo S.p.A. (100%)
 Istituto Luce - Cinecittà S.r.l. (100%)
 MEFOP - Società per lo Sviluppo del Mercato dei Fondi Pensione S.p.A. (58,21%)
 Rete Autostrade Mediterranee S.p.A. (100%)
 SOGEI S.p.A. (100%)
 SOGESID S.p.A. (100%)
 SOGIN S.p.A. (100%)
 SOSE - Soluzioni per il sistema economico S.p.a. (88,8%)
 Sport e salute S.p.a (100%)
 STMicroelectronics Holding N.V. (50%)
 Studiare Sviluppo S.r.l. (100%)

Overseen institutions 
MEF oversees the following institutions:
Cassa Ufficiali della Guardia di Finanza ('Fund for Officers of the Guardia di Finanza'), a social security and welfare entity reserved to the officers of the Guardia di Finanza established in 1934
Fondo di previdenza per il personale appartenente ai ruoli di ispettori, sovrintendenti, appuntati, finanzieri della Guardia di Finanza ('Social Security Fund for the Personnel with the role of inspectors, superintendents, appointed, financiers of the Guardia di Finanza'), a social security entity for the personnel (except of the officers) of the Guardia di Finanza established in 1934
Fondo di previdenza per il personale dell'ex Ministero delle Finanze ('Social Security Fund for the personnel of former Ministry of Finances'), a social security entity for the members of former Ministry of Finances established in 1981 and regulated in 1984.

See also 
 Government of Italy
 Economy of Italy
 Guardia di Finanza
 List of Italian Ministers of Economy and Finance

References

External links 
 

Economy and Finance
Italy
Italy
Finance in Italy